Evergestis simulatilis is a moth in the family Crambidae. It was described by Augustus Radcliffe Grote in 1880. It is found in North America, where it has been recorded from Alberta, Arizona, British Columbia, California, Colorado, Montana, Nevada and New Mexico.

The wingspan is about 26 mm. The forewings are shaded with white and brown. The hindwings are silvery drab with a darker margin. Adults have been recorded on wing from March to April and from June to October.

References

Evergestis
Moths described in 1880
Moths of North America